The Minister of Local Government is a cabinet minister in the province of Manitoba, Canada. The position was created in 1999 as the Minister of Intergovernmental Affairs. The portfolio was designated as Intergovernmental Affairs and Trade from November 2003 to September 2006, when responsibility for trade was shifted to the new portfolio of Competitiveness, Training and Trade. Then, the portfolio went back to being called Intergovernmental Affairs. In November 2009, when Greg Selinger became Premier, the portfolio was renamed Local Government. In October 2013, it was renamed Municipal Government.

List of Ministers of Intergovernmental Affairs

The Minister responsible for International Relations Coordination existed from 2003 to 2006. Rather than a full portfolio position, it was concurrently held by the Minister of Intergovernmental Affairs.

List of Ministers of Local Government

List of Ministers of Municipal Government

List of Ministers of Municipal Relations

References 

Local Government, Minister of